Surlej is a village in Graubünden, Switzerland. It is located close to Sankt Moritz and Silvaplana.

The town is known for having had Friedrich Nietzsche among its visitors; the philosopher spent every summer from 1883 to 1888 there. He often sat on a stone on the shore of Lake Silvaplana, where he came up with the idea of eternal recurrence, the key concept of his major poetic work "Thus Spoke Zarathustra".

References

Villages in Switzerland
Silvaplana